Rayle is a town in Wilkes County, Georgia, United States. The population was 139 at the 2000 census.

Geography

Rayle is located at  (33.790184, -82.896599).

Demographics

As of the census of 2000, there were 139 people, 54 households, and 38 families living in the town. The racial makeup of the town was 79.14% White, 15.83% African American, 0.72% Native American, 2.16% from other races, and 2.16% from two or more races. Hispanic or Latino of any race were 3.60% of the population.

There were 54 households, out of which 29.6% had children under the age of 18 living with them, 59.3% were married couples living together, 9.3% had a female householder with no husband present, and 29.6% were non-families. 27.8% of all households were made up of individuals, and 5.6% had someone living alone who was 65 years of age or older. The average household size was 2.46 and the average family size was 3.03.

In the town, the population was spread out, with 25.9% under the age of 18, 5.0% from 18 to 24, 28.1% from 25 to 44, 26.6% from 45 to 64, and 14.4% who were 65 years of age or older. The median age was 39 years. For every 100 females, there were 113.8 males. For every 100 females age 18 and over, there were 114.6 males.

The median income for a household in the town was $33,229, and the median income for a family was $33,542. Males had a median income of $31,458 versus $16,667 for females. The per capita income for the town was $15,160. There were 15.8% of families and 26.3% of the population living below the poverty line, including 55.0% of under eighteens and 18.8% of those over 64.

See also

 Central Savannah River Area

References

Towns in Wilkes County, Georgia
Towns in Georgia (U.S. state)